Tatyana Palchuk Rikane ( Rikāne; born 1954 in Riga, Latvian SSR) is a Latvian Russian artist.

Early life 
Her father, a Russian soldier, died shortly after World War II and she was raised by her mother. Her family had little financial resources and her mother struggled to take care of them.

From 1967 to 1973 she studied at the Jānis Rozentāls Art High School, where she received college-level education. From 1975 to 1981 she studied at the Art Academy of Latvia, in the department of painting. From 1984 to 1987 she attended the USSR Academy of Arts for her postgraduate studies. She studied with Western school academics such as marine painter Eduards Kalnins (Eduard Kalnins). Palchuk studied the European academic school of painting. In 2003 she received an MA in Fine Art and Painting.

Career

Her artistic productions are influenced by the Italian Renaissance (14th–16th century), the Northern Renaissance (15th–16th century) and the French Illuminated Manuscripts (15th century). She is a member of the Latvian Art Union. She teaches painting, drawing and composition and her students work in many countries. Palchuk regularly participates in exhibitions, including ten solo exhibitions and numerous group exhibitions. Her paintings are housed in both public and private collections.

Achievements
 2019. NY Art News article-https://www.ny-artnews.com/single-post/2019/12/03/An-interview-with-20th-century-born-artist-Tatyana-Palchuk
 2019. 01.12. Work -Mozart- sold in Ravenel International Art Group Autumn Auction
 2019. 01.-12. Exposed in Alessandro Berni Gallery – New York - USA
 2019. 03. New Series "Rainbow" Solo Show in Homeland – Iecava Culture Hall
 2019. 05. Venice International Biennale, Group Exhibition, - Prize - Womans Art Award
 2019. 05. International Group Preview Exhibition –Fong-Yi Art Gallery Taichung, Taiwan
 2019. 05. International Group Preview Exhibition –Kaohsiung, J.P. Art Center, Taiwan
 2019. 05. International Group Preview Exhibition –Grand Hyatt H.K., Wanchai, China
 2019. 05. International Group Preview Exhibition –Mariot Taipei, Taipei, Taiwan
 2019.01.06. Work "Hunting Summer" sold in Ravanel International Auction House
 2019. Ministry of Culture Latvia - https://www.km.gov.lv/lv/kultura/visi-jaunumi/tatjana-palcuka-rikane-sanem-waa-woman-art-award-balvu-un-piedalisies-58-venecijas-biennale-3427
 2019. First 2019.Solo Show - Pirms Venēcijas biennāles gleznu «Varavīksne» uzmirdz mājās -  Iecava
 Contemporary Art Curator magazine - 
 Contemporary Art Curator magazine - Interview with Tatyana Palchuk
 "About Art Magazine" Issue N3/4 2016. - N1 2017. MAMAG Modern Art Museum, Gallery Gmbh, Austria.
 ART International Contemporary Magazine - Issue N3 May/June 2017, EA Editore, Italy
 ART International Contemporary Magazine - Issue N3 May/June 2017, EA Editore, Italy
 Art Cataloque - Francisco Goya International Award - EA Editore - April 2017 - Palermo
 International Prize Christoforo Colombo "Art Explorer". Italy 18 Feb 2017
 Costanza Foundation Italy "Knight of Art" Award and Medal. 28 Feb 2017
 Francisco Goya International Award Spain-Italy 6 May 2017.
 Academia Italia in Arte Nel Mondo, "Diego Velasquez International Art Award " July 2017.
 "The Best 2014 Modern and Contemporary Artists" Italy, EA Editore, Palermo 03.2014.
 Italy- "Over Art" N3, EA Editore, June 2014.
 TVNet,Latvia, December 2013
 "Europ, ART", Geneve, N6, 30 April 1997. Swiss.
 Pogodin V.S., art researcher "The River of Time in its Course" ("Река времен в своем стремлении")// Magazin "Woman’s World" ("Мир женщины"), Moscow, Russia, 1995, Nr. 1, 22.-24.
 Hajenko S.I., art researcher, "The Unity of the Opposites" ("Единство противоположнотей")// Magazine "Galerija", Riga, Latvija, 1997, Nr.2
 IvĜevs A., poet, journalist, "The Beauty wi ll save the World" ("Красота спасет мир")//Newspaper "Bal ti jasavize", Riga, Latvi ja, 26.05.95. , Nr . 21
 Ozerskaja I., writer, "The Painting Forever" ("Картина навсегда") // magazine "Steeple" ("Шпиль"), Riga, Latvia, 2000, Nr. 2/3
 Rizova C.M. journalist, Magazine "Love" ("Люблю"), Riga, Latvia, 2000, Nr. 2(3)
 Savisko M. Hunting// Magazine "Plus Art" ("Māksla plus"), Rīga, Latvia, 2000, Nr . 2
 2014 Article by Aina Ušča

References
 New York Art News 2019.12.- https://www.ny-artnews.com/single-post/2019/12/03/An-interview-with-20th-century-born-artist-Tatyana-Palchuk
 LSM Russian - https://rus.lsm.lv/statja/kultura/kultura/hudozhnica-zhivuschaja-v-latvii-no-uzhe-pjat-let-rabotayuschaja-tolko-na-zapade-i-yugo-vostoke-kultura1kb.a335856/

 Ministry of Culture Latvia -https://www.km.gov.lv/lv/kultura/visi-jaunumi/tatjana-palcuka-rikane-sanem-waa-woman-art-award-balvu-un-piedalisies-58-venecijas-biennale-3427
 2019.First Solo Show - http://www.iecava.lv/lv/zinas/kultura/25226-pirms-venecijas-biennales-gleznu-varaviksne-uzmirdz-majas
 Two Catalogs from 2 Solo Shows -Antwerp -2017 and London 2018.- Ludwig Trossaert Gallery. - https://www.visiononart.com/kopie-van-bib-nollet-sylvie
 My Artist Diary - StudioByblos- Italy - TATYANA PALCHUK - my artistic diary
 ACS Art Mag Chicago-  Pages 289 - 303 - https://www.acs-mag.com/acs-magazine-mar-june-2018
 The Solo Show Cat. Belgium 2017 - https://en.calameo.com/read/000062612c1d8e7b048bc
 The Baltics Today - http://www.balticsww.com/post/exhibition-of-tatyana-palchuk-hymn-to-creativity-at-rietumu-gallery/
 French institute Denmark - http://www.institutfrancais.dk/fr/copenhague/agenda/scene-musique/premiere-session-dart-europeen-fr
 Circle-arts - https://circle-arts.com/tatyana-palchuk/
 Press - Rietumu Bank - https://www.rietumu.com/press?OpenDocument&nid=192310DB65F41E2EC22580BC00536EA1&sub=
 Visiononart - Ludwig Trossaert - https://www.visiononart.com/tatyana-palchuk
 Circle quarterly falls issuu Magazine - https://issuu.com/circlefoundationforthearts/docs/circlequarterlyartreview-bycfapress
 Contemporary Art Curator Directory - http://www.contemporaryartcurator.com/tatyana-palchuk/
 Contemporary Art Curator Magazine (jan.8.2018.)publication-http://www.contemporaryartcuratormagazine.com/home-2/interview-with-tatyana-palchuk
 Broadcasting Radio4 about T.Palchuk - http://lr4.lsm.lv/lv/raksts/aleksandr-studija/tatjana-palchuk-rikane-mne-nuzhen-talantliviy-zritel.a101927/

1954 births
Living people
Artists from Riga
Latvian people of Russian descent
Latvian women painters
20th-century Latvian painters
21st-century Latvian painters
20th-century Latvian women artists
21st-century Latvian women artists
Latvian women curators